Omar Camporese was the defending champion, but lost in the quarterfinals to Sergi Bruguera.

Boris Becker won the title by defeating Bruguera 6–3, 6–3 in the final.

Seeds

Draw

Finals

Top half

Bottom half

References

External links
 Official results archive (ATP)
 Official results archive (ITF)

Milan Indoor - Singles, 1993
Milan